Princess Elisabeth of Stolberg-Rossla (23 July 1885, Roßla—16 October 1969, Eutin, Schleswig-Holstein) was the second wife of Duke Johann Albrecht of Mecklenburg, Regent of the Duchy of Brunswick.

Early life
Born into an ancient House of Stolberg, she was second daughter of Prince Botho of Stolberg-Rossla, son of Count Karl of Stolberg-Rossla and his wife, Countess Bertha of Solms-Rödelheim and Assenheim. Her mother was Princess Hedwig of Ysenburg and Büdingen, eldest daughter of Bruno, 3rd Prince of Ysenburg and Büdingen and Princess Mathilde of Solms-Hohensolms-Lich.

First marriage
She was married to Duke Johann Albrecht of Mecklenburg-Schwerin on 15 December 1909, a year after the death of his first wife Princess Elisabeth Sybille of Saxe-Weimar-Eisenach. Their marriage was childless.

Second marriage
After her first husband's death in 1920, Elisabeth remarried to his half-brother, Duke Adolf Friedrich of Mecklenburg, at Ludwigslust in Grand Duchy of Mecklenburg-Schwerin. Although this marriage also remained childless, she became stepmother to Duchess Woizlawa Feodora of Mecklenburg, who at the age of 100, was the oldest living royal and the oldest living resident of Gorwihl.

Death
Elisabeth died in Eutin, Schleswig-Holstein, on 16 October 1969, only two months after the death of her second husband.

Ancestry

References

1885 births
1969 deaths
Duchesses of Mecklenburg-Schwerin
House of Mecklenburg-Schwerin
House of Stolberg
People from Südharz
Grand Cordons of the Order of the Precious Crown